Red grass may refer to:

The Red Grass, a 1950 novel by the French writer Boris Vian
The Red Grass (TV series), a British science fiction children's television series
Red grass, Bothriochloa macra, a species of grass